Kristoffer Lie Løkberg (born 22 January 1992) is a Norwegian footballer who plays as a midfielder for Viking.

Career
Løkberg made his debut for Ranheim in starting 11 in a 1–1 draw in an OBOS-ligaen game against Sandefjord Fotball.

Løkberg had an unsuccessful stay at Sheffield United from 2010 to 2012.

In Ranheims Eliteserien debut, Løkberg scored two goals in the 4–1 win against Stabæk.

On 13 August 2019, Løkberg transferred to Viking FK, signing a contract until the end of the 2021 season. On 4 May 2021, his contract was extended for two more years.

Career statistics

Club

Honours
Viking
Norwegian Football Cup: 2019

References

External links

1992 births
Living people
Norwegian footballers
Strindheim IL players
Ranheim Fotball players
SK Brann players
Viking FK players
Norwegian First Division players
Eliteserien players
Norwegian expatriate footballers
Expatriate footballers in England
Norwegian expatriate sportspeople in England
Norway youth international footballers
Association football midfielders
Footballers from Trondheim